This is a list of Spring 1976 PGA Tour Qualifying School graduates. The event was held at the Bay Tree Golf Club at North Myrtle Beach, South Carolina. There were 280 players at the event. The event lasted 108 holes in total. After 36 holes, the first cut would reduce the field to 140 players and ties. After 72 holes, the second cut would reduce the field to the low 60 and ties and any other players within 10 strokes of the lead.

Tournament summary 
Craig Stadler and David Strawn, both recent winners of the U.S. Amateur, were the favorites. This was the second time Mark Lye attempted to earn PGA Tour credentials at q-school. Billy Kratzert attended the school for the third straight year.

Australian Bob Shearer and American Woody Blackburn shared medallist honors at 426 (−6). Among the favorites, Stadler successfully graduated, earning the last spot, while Strawn did not. Mark Lye unsuccessful in moving onto the PGA Tour once again. Kratzert was successful, however, this time.

List of graduates 

Source:

References 

1976 1
PGA Tour Qualifying School Graduates
PGA Tour Qualifying School Graduates